Aframomum mannii is a species of plant in the ginger family, Zingiberaceae.  It was first described by Daniel Oliver and D.Hanb. and got its current name from Karl Moritz Schumann.

Range
Aframomum mannii is native to Gabon.

References 

mannii